Baisha is a town of Shanghang County, Fujian, China. , it has 22 villages under its administration.

References

Township-level divisions of Fujian
Shanghang County